Corwin Samuel Clatt (February 5, 1924 – June 2, 1997) was an American football fullback who played two seasons with the Chicago Cardinals of the National Football League (NFL). He was drafted by the Cardinals in the sixth round of the 1945 NFL Draft. He played college football at the University of Notre Dame and attended East Peoria High School in East Peoria, Illinois.

Early years
Clatt played high school football for the East Peoria High School Red Raiders. He was a first-team all state selection and named the outstanding high school player in Illinois his senior year in 1940. The Red Raiders compiled a record of 26-5-1 during his four years with the team. He was inducted into the Greater Peoria Sports Hall of Fame.

College career
Clatt played college football for the Notre Dame Fighting Irish and a member of national championship teams in 1946 and 1947. He was the Irish's leading rusher in 1942, recording 698 yards on 138 carries. He also played in the Chicago College All-Star Game.

Professional career
Clatt was selected by the Chicago Cardinals with the 45th pick in the 1945 NFL Draft. He played in 21 games for the Cardinals from 1948 to 1949.

Coaching career
Clatt became the head coach of the East Peoria High School Red Raiders in 1957. He also coached the Red Raiders track team, which won the Mid-State 8 title in 1963.

References

External links
Just Sports Stats
College stats

1924 births
1997 deaths
American football fullbacks
Chicago Cardinals players
Fort Riley Centaurs football players
Notre Dame Fighting Irish football players
High school football coaches in Illinois
People from East Peoria, Illinois
People from West Des Moines, Iowa
Players of American football from Illinois